Zhifu Island or North Island, is an islet with historical significance in Shandong Province, China. The name of the islet Chefoo was generalized to mean the entire Yantai region in older western literature.

Etymologies
Possibilities include:
 "A Barrier in the Shape of a Magical Plant"
 Zhi is a magical and powerful plant, which the island's shape resembles
 Fu a barrier of ocean
 A magical mountain name (significance unknown)
 From Qin Dynasty's Zhifu, officially changed to the present character in late Qing Dynasty.

Administration
Administratively, Zhifu Island is a part of Dàtuǎn Village, Xingfu Sub-district, Zhifu District, Yantai City, Shandong Province. Dàtuǎn has a part on the mainland, where the offices and most residents are.

History 
Archeological excavations have uncovered over 200 artifacts, including stone axes, and short axes (錛 : Bēn), pottery fragments, bone needles, and bone hairpins. These and Carbon-14 dating indicated that the island has been settled since the Neolithic period.

People were buried here during the Zhou Dynasty, including  Duke Kang of Qi, who died on the island in 379 BC. The ruins of the cemetery still exist today. The Lord Yang Temple (陽主廟 Yángzhǔ Miào) was built during the early Zhou Dynasty by rulers of the State of Qí in honor of Lord Yang, the fifth deity of the Eight Divine Generals.

Because of a legend of a Mountain of Immortality, China's first emperor Qin Shi Huang visited the island three times looking for the elixir. He left a couple of stone inscriptions that are still visible today: 
 During his second visit in 218 BC, he left the inscription: "Arrived at Fu, and carved the stone" (登之罘，刻石).
 The last time he visited (210 BC) he wrote: "Came to Fu, saw an enormous stone, and shot one fish" (至之罘，見巨石，射殺一魚).
Today, there are places like Shihuang Avenue (始皇道 Shihuang Dao), and Fish-shooting Tower (射魚台 Sheyu Tai) named after the emperor. Having failed to discover the elixir, Qin Shihuang dispatched the court sorcerer Xu Fu from Yantai, to sail away and find the elixir of life with hundreds of men and women.

After performing a ceremony in the Yangzhu Temple, Emperor Wudi of the Han Dynasty also left an inscription in 94 BC: "Arrived at Zhifu, which floats on Great Ocean.  Mountains call out 'Ten thousand years!" (登芝罘，浮大海，山稱萬歲).

Now, the island is mainly a tourist attraction where clams and abalones can be fished here in abundance.

Geography 
Located in Bohai Sea, the island is 4 km from Downtown Zhifu and is 10 km x 1 km. Part of Public Road No. 26 connects the western end of the island and the north part of the mainland peninsula. Originally, the island was disconnected from the mainland, but for a period of millennium of years, the sand and soil in the ocean floor built up a 600-metre wide pathway. Thus the island is called the "Mainland-connecting Island" in Chinese; it could even be considered a small peninsula.

The island's largest mountain is Laoye Mountain (老爺山 Lǎoyé Shān) at 294.1m. The Old Lady Stone (婆婆石 Pópó Shí) is on a cliff, at 43.49 metres above sea level, named because of its resemblance to a woman hugging the ocean waves. The southern part of the island is forested.

References

Islands of Shandong
Bohai Sea
Yantai